Mehbooba may refer to
Mehbooba (1976 film), a Hindi-language film
Mehbooba (2008 film), a Hindi-language romance film
Mehbooba (2018 film), a Telugu-language film
Mehbooba Mahnoor Chandni, Bangladeshi model, actress and dancer
Mehbooba Mufti (born 1959), Indian politician